Faith in You is the sixteenth studio album by American country music singer Steve Wariner, released on May 9, 2000. His third and final release for Capitol Nashville, it includes the singles "Faith in You" and "Katie Wants a Fast One", the latter a duet with labelmate Garth Brooks. Also included is the radio edit of the Clint Black duet "Been There", from Black's 1999 album D'lectrified.

Critical reception
Giving it three stars out of five, William Ruhlmann praised Wariner for the multiple musical styles on the album, saying that "country is a music that rewards adherence to its heritage, and country has no more faithful servant than Steve Wariner."

Track listing

Personnel

 Chuck Ainlay – mixing
 Bob Bailey – background vocals (1,11)
 Eddie Bayers – drums (2,3,6,7,11,12)
 Clint Black – harmonica (9), producer, background vocals (9), lead vocals (9)
 Holly Bonds – crowd noise (4)
 Kevin Bonds – crowd noise (4)
 Bekka Bramlett – background vocals (4)
 Jason Breckling – production assistant
 Steve Brewster – brush drums (2), drum programming (1,10), trash cans (4)
 Garth Brooks – lead vocals (4)
 Lenny Castro – percussion (9)
 Lisa Cochran – background vocals (1,11)
 Eric Conn – digital editing
 Doug DeLong – production assistant
 Jerry Douglas – dobro (9)
 Stuart Duncan – fiddle (9)
 Tom Flora – background vocals (2)
 Paul Franklin – dobro (11), lap steel guitar (12), steel guitar (2,3,6,7,12)
 Ron Gannaway – drums (1,4,5), percussion (10)
 Randy Gardner – engineer, string engineer
 Sonny Garrish – steel guitar (5)
 Carl Gorodetzky – concert master (2,5,8)
 Gary Grant – trumpet (9)
 Barry Green – trombone (4)
 Carlos Grier – digital editing
 Vicki Hampton – background vocals (1,11)
 Mike Haynes – trumpet (4)
 Aubrey Haynie – fiddle (2,3,6,7,12), mandolin (11)
 Jerry Hey – trumpet (9)
 Dan Higgins – baritone saxophone (9)
 Bob Horn – production assistant
 Jim Horn – horn arrangements (4), baritone saxophone (4) 
 Marcus Hummon – acoustic guitar (12)
 Denise Jarvis – production assistant
 John Barlow Jarvis – piano (1,4,5,12)
 Abraham Laboriel – bass guitar (9) 
 Sam Levine – tenor saxophone (4)
 Woody Lingle – bass guitar (1,4,5)
 Brent Mason – electric guitar (2,3,6,7,11)
 Jimmy Mattingly – fiddle (1)
 The Nashville String Machine – strings (2,5,8)
 Steve Nathan – Hammond B-3 organ (1,6,11), synthesizer (1,5,7,10,12)
 Joel Peskin – tenor saxophone (9)
 Denny Purcell – mastering
 Steve Real – background vocals (9)
 Bill Reichenbach Jr. – trombone (9)
 Tom Roady – percussion (1,2,4,6,7,8,11,12)
 John Robinson – drums (9)
 Matt Rollings – Wurlitzer (11), piano (2,3,6,7,8,9) 
 John Saylor – production assistant
 Joey Schmidt – accordion (10)
 Mike Severs – acoustic guitar (4)
 Harry Stinson – hand drums (13), background vocals (1,2,4,6,7,11,12)
 Caryn Wariner – crowd noise (4), production assistant
 Ross Wariner – "Power" guitar (1), crowd noise (4) 
 Ryan Wariner – electric guitar (13)
 Steve Wariner – bass (10), 12-string acoustic guitar (7), 12-string electric guitar (1), acoustic guitar (1,5,9,10,11,12), acoustic guitar solo (4), classical guitar (5,8,10), electric guitar (10,13), electric B-bender guitar (11), electric baritone guitar (1), high electric guitar (7), lap steel guitar (4),  guitar solos (7), crowd noise (4), papoose (4), producer, background vocals (6,7,10,12), lead vocals
 Terry Wariner – baritone guitar (13), mouth percussion (13), background vocals (5,8,10)
 Biff Watson – acoustic guitar (2,3,6,7,8,11)
 Bergen White – string arrangements (2,5,8)
 Glenn Worf – acoustic bass (3,8,12), electric bass (2,6,7,11)
 Reggie Young – electric guitar (1,4,5)

Chart performance

References

2000 albums
Steve Wariner albums
Capitol Records albums